Susan C. Fisher is an American politician who served as a member of the North Carolina House of Representatives for the 114th district  from 2004 until her resignation in 2022. After the 2014 elections, Fisher was elected deputy leader by her House Democratic colleagues, she served in the role from 2015 until 2017.

Electoral history

2020

2018

2016

2014

2012

2010

2008

2006

2004

Committee assignments

2021-2022 session
Appropriations
Appropriations - Education
Education - K-12 (Vice Chair)
Alcoholic Beverage Control
Election Law and Campaign Finance Reform
Local Government - Land Use, Planning and Development

2019-2020 session
Appropriations
Appropriations - Education
Alcoholic Beverage Control (Vice Chair)
Education - K-12
Election Law and Campaign Finance Reform
State and Local Government

2017-2018 session
Appropriations
Appropriations - Education
Alcoholic Beverage Control (Vice Chair)
Elections and Ethics Law
State and Local Government I
Judiciary II
Aging

2015-2016 session
Appropriations
Appropriations - General Government (Vice-Chair)
Aging (Vice-Chair)
Alcoholic Beverage Control
Education - K-12
Elections
Local Government

2013-2014 session
Appropriations
Education
Elections
Government
Banking
Commerce and Job Development

2011-2012 session
Appropriations
Education
Elections
Government
Banking

2009-2010 session
Appropriations
Education
Election Law and Campaign Finance Reform
Local Government I
Energy and Energy Efficiency
Judiciary III

References

External links
North Carolina General Assembly - Representative Susan C. Fisher official NC House website
Project Vote Smart - Representative Susan C. Fisher (NC) profile
Follow the Money - Susan C. Fisher
2008 2006 2004 Campaign Contributions

|-

Living people
1955 births
People from Morganton, North Carolina
People from Asheville, North Carolina
University of Maryland, College Park alumni
Democratic Party members of the North Carolina House of Representatives
Women state legislators in North Carolina
21st-century American politicians
21st-century American women politicians